San Andres station is a railway station located on the South Main Line in the city of Manila, Philippines.

San Andres station is the seventh station southbound from Tutuban.

History
The original San Andres station was opened around 1929 as a flag stop on the defunct Naic Line and closed in 1936.

A new San Andres station on the Main Line South was opened on March 24, 2010 for commuter services.

Nearby landmarks
The station is near the Singalong sub-district of San Andres, the Dagonoy Public Market, Puregold Extra, and St. Anthony's School, Manila. Further away from the station are the Bureau of Plant Industry, Ermita, and the Manila Zoo.

Transportation links
San Andres station is accessible by jeepneys plying the San Andres route, as well as buses plying routes on Osmeña Highway. A LRT-1 station, Quirino, is located further up San Andres Street on the intersection with Taft Avenue.

Station Layout

Philippine National Railways stations
Railway stations opened in 2010
Railway stations in Metro Manila
Buildings and structures in San Andres, Manila